This is a list of the municipalities in the state of Bahia (BA), located in the Northeast Region of Brazil. Bahia is divided into 417 municipalities, which are grouped into 32 microregions, which are grouped into 7 mesoregions.

See also

Geography of Brazil
List of cities in Brazil

Bahia